Billardiera cymosa, the sweet apple-berry, is a small vine native to woodland and coastal heath of Victoria and South Australia.

The leaves are slender and stems are twining. Flowers are bluish, greenish or cream. The fruit is a sausage shaped berry 1–1.5 cm long.

References

External links
Billardiera cymosa Electronic Flora of South Australia species Fact Sheet
Billardiera cymosa VicFlora Flora of Victoria
Billardiera cymosa Flickr search
Billardiera cymosa Google image search

Bushfood
cymosa
Flora of Victoria (Australia)
Flora of South Australia
Taxa named by Ferdinand von Mueller